Apis or APIS may refer to:

Apis (deity), an ancient Egyptian god
Apis (Greek mythology), several different figures in Greek mythology
Apis (city), an ancient seaport town on the northern coast of Africa
Apis (genus), the genus of the honey bee
Apis (constellation), an obsolete name for Musca
Dragutin Dimitrijević (1876–1917), known as "Apis", Serbian colonel and coup organiser, leader of the Black Hand group 
Albastar Apis, a Slovenian motor glider
Wezel Apis 2, a German motor glider
Advance Passenger Information System, an electronic data interchange system
Aircraft Positioning and Information System, an airport stand guidance system

See also
 API (disambiguation) for "APIs" 
Application programming interface